Christian Louis Heinrich Köhler (5 September 1820 – 16 February 1886) was a German composer, conductor and piano teacher.

Biography
Köhler was born in Braunschweig. He studied piano in Vienna under Carl Maria von Bocklet, Simon Sechter and Ignaz von Seyfried. As a conductor, he worked in Marienburg and Elbing. After that he settled in Königsberg in 1847, after which time he concentrated on piano teaching and writings on music. Among his pupils were  Adolf Jensen and Hermann Goetz.

He was a critic for the Hartungsche Zeitung from 1849 to 1886, and was a contributor to Signale für die musikalische Welt from 1844 until 1886. His writings were well known to Liszt and Wagner; he also proposed the formation of the Allgemeiner Deutscher Musikverein, with which Liszt was involved.

Köhler composed three operas and a ballet, and wrote books on musical theory. He also wrote educational works for piano.

He died in Königsberg.

Selected writings
 Die Melodie der Sprache (Leipzig, 1853)
 Systematische Lehrmethode für Klavierspiel und Musik (Leipzig, 1857–8, 3/1888)
 Die Gebrüder Müller und das Streichquartett (Leipzig, 1858)
 Führer durch den Clavierunterricht (Leipzig, 1859, 9/1894)
 Der Clavierunterricht: Studien, Erfahrungen und Ratschläge (Leipzig, 1860, 6/1905)
 Leicht fassliche Harmonie- und Generalbass-Lehre (Königsberg, 1861, 3/1880)
 Gesangs-Führer (Leipzig, 1863)
 Die neue Richtung in der Musik (Leipzig, 1864)
 Einige Betrachtungen über Sonst und Jetzt (Leipzig, 1867)
 Johannes Brahms und seine Stellung in der neueren Musikgeschichte (Hanover, 1880)
 Allgemeine Musiklehre (Leipzig, 1883)
 Katechismus der Harmonielehre (Stuttgart, 1888, 2/1892)
 ''Allegro Moderato (1880)

References

External links
 

1820 births
1886 deaths
19th-century classical composers
19th-century conductors (music)
19th-century German composers
German conductors (music)
German male classical composers
German male conductors (music)
German music educators
German Romantic composers
Piano pedagogues
Musicians from Braunschweig
People from the Duchy of Brunswick